Muchin College Prep is a public four-year charter high school located in the Chicago Loop in Chicago, Illinois, United States. It is a part of the Noble Network of Charter Schools. It is named for Allan and Elaine Muchin. Muchin College Prep was founded in 2009 by Kimberly Neal-Brannum. The Founding Principal, Kimberly Neal-Brannum led the school until 2015.

The science labs at Muchin were also funded by Michael and Karyn Lutz, and Baxter International has been an active partner, contributing to the growth of the science labs and providing career exploration programs as well as scholarships for Muchin alumni.

Muchin has earned a 1+ school rating since 2014 when Chicago Public Schools began issuing such ratings. Additionally, Muchin's standardized test scores have consistently ranked among the top ten non-selective enrollment schools in Chicago.  Based on 2017-2018 school year data, Muchin earned an SQRP total score of a 4.7, making the school the top 9th-12th grade only high school in Chicago.

References

External links
Noble Network of Charter Schools
TheCharterSCALE: Muchin College Prep

Educational institutions established in 2009
Noble Network of Charter Schools
Public high schools in Chicago
2009 establishments in Illinois